The 2022–23 Liga Leumit will be the 24th season as second tier since its realignment in 1999 and the 81st season of second-tier football in Israel.

A total of sixteen teams will be contesting in the league, including twelve sides from the 2020-21 season, the two promoted teams from 2021–22 Liga Alef and the two relegated teams from 2021–22 Israeli Premier League.

Changes from 2021–22 season
The following teams have changed division since the 2021–22 season.

To Liga Leumit

Promoted from Liga Alef
 Maccabi Jaffa (South Division)
 Ironi Tiberias (North Division)

Relegated from Premier League
 Hapoel Nof HaGalil
 Maccabi Petah Tikva

From Liga Leumit

Promoted to Premier League
 Maccabi Bnei Reineh
 Sektzia Nes Tziona

Relegated to Liga Alef
 Hapoel Ra'anana
 Beitar Tel Aviv Bat Yam

Overview

Stadions and locations

Standings

Results

Position by round

References

2022–23 in Israeli football leagues
Liga Leumit seasons
Isr
Current association football seasons